The Orbetello Challenger was a professional tennis tournament played on outdoor red clay courts. It was part of the Association of Tennis Professionals (ATP) Challenger Tour. It was held annually in Orbetello, Italy, from 2009 to 2013.

A new tournament named International Tennis Tournament of Cortina, held in Cortina d'Ampezzo, Italy, took its place in the schedule in 2014.

Past finals

Singles

Doubles

External links
Official website
ITF search

 
ATP Challenger Tour
Clay court tennis tournaments
Tennis tournaments in Italy